Profile is a 1954 British thriller film directed by Francis Searle and starring John Bentley, Kathleen Byron and Thea Gregory.

It was shot at Shepperton Studios. The film's sets were designed by the art director Norman G. Arnold.

Cast
 John Bentley as Peter 
 Kathleen Byron as Margot 
 Thea Gregory as Susan 
 Stuart Lindsell as Aubrey 
 Ivan Craig as Jerry 
 Garard Green as Charlie 
 Lloyd Lamble as Michael 
 Frank Henderson as Mr. Freeman 
 Arnold Bell as Inspector Crawford 
 Charles Saynor as Policeman 
 Derek Prentice as Doctor 
 June Charlier as Barmaid

References

Bibliography
 Chibnall, Steve & McFarlane, Brian. The British 'B' Film. Palgrave MacMillan, 2009.

External links

1954 films
British thriller films
1950s thriller films
Films directed by Francis Searle
Films shot at Shepperton Studios
Films set in London
British black-and-white films
1950s English-language films
1950s British films